Aethalida banggaiensis is a moth of the family Erebidae. It was described by Nieuwenhuis in 1948. It is found on Banggai Island.

References

Moths described in 1948
Spilosomina
Moths of Indonesia